The 1961 Villanova Wildcats football team represented the Villanova University during the 1961 NCAA University Division football season. The head coach was Alexander F. Bell, coaching his second season with the Wildcats. The team played their home games at Villanova Stadium in Villanova, Pennsylvania. Villanova won the 1961 Sun Bowl and finished the season 8–2.

Schedule

References

Villanova
Villanova Wildcats football seasons
Sun Bowl champion seasons
Villanova Wildcats football